Mandarin  (Hokkien , also known in Hokkien ) is a Chinese dice game traditionally played as part of the celebration of the Mid-Autumn Festival. It is traditionally played with six dice and a china bowl.

The game dates back to the 1600s when it is said to have been invented by the Chinese general Koxinga of the Southern Ming, along with his lower officer Hong Xu. Zheng was stationed with his troops in Amoy planning the Siege of Fort Zeelandia to take Dutch Formosa, which had been occupied by the Dutch since 1624. The game was an attempt to boost the morale of Koxinga's homesick troops during the Mid-Autumn Festival. The game became popular in Amoy (now Xiamen) and is considered a folk game.

The Hokkien Chinese name Po̍ah-piáⁿ translates as "gambling for cakes", and the game traditionally has 63 different sized mooncakes as prizes for the winning players: 32 of the smallest cake, half as many of the next largest, and so on ending with a single large Chiōng-gôan cake. In modern times, the game's instructions are often printed on mooncake packaging, although the game is also played with prizes of daily necessities, household appliances or money.

In the Philippines, the game is known as "Pua Tiong Chiu" (Hokkien ) among the Chinese Filipino community, where the prizes are often usually money and/or appliances for adults and sometimes toys and food for children or sometimes mooncakes known in Hokkien  or Hokkien .

Rules
The game requires six dice and a wide mouthed bowl. The first player is assigned and rolls the dice and wins a specific prize depending on the dice combination. The dice are then passed to the next person, and the process is repeated until there are no prizes left. A throw is declared invalid if at least one of the dice lands outside the bowl.

If a player makes an ultimate throw, they receive all of the other mooncakes designated for 6th to 1st place, even those which were already awarded. This rule can be omitted to ensure all players receive a prize.

Sometimes, the 3rd and 4th place are switched by game organizers.

Rituals
Some players believe in rituals when playing the game that they believe will give them good luck. Reported practices includes throwing the dice with one or two hands, or exclaiming "Chiong Wan!"

References

Hokkien culture
Chinese-Filipino culture
Dice games
Xiamen